Jamaal is a masculine given name, from the Arabic, meaning "handsome" or "beauty". Notable people include:

Jamaal Anderson (born 1986), American football player
Jamaal Bowman (born 1976), American politician
Jamaal Branch (born 1981), American football player
Jamaal Charles (born 1986), American football player
Jamaal Franklin (born 1991), American basketball player
Jamaal Fudge (born 1983), American football player
Jamaal Green (born 1980), American football player
Jamaal Jackson (born 1980), American football player
Jamaal Lascelles (born 1993), English footballer
Jamaal Magloire (born 1978), Canadian basketball player
Jamaal Smith (born 1988), Guyanese footballer
Jamaal Tatum (born 1984), American basketball player
Jamaal Tinsley (born 1978), American basketball player
Jamaal Torrance (born 1983), American sprinter
Jamaal Westerman (born 1985), American football player
Jamaal Wilkes (born 1953), American basketball player
Jamaal Williams (born 1995), American football player

See also
Jamal

Masculine given names